James Grierson may refer to:
 James Grierson (British Army officer), British Army general
 James Grierson (minister, born 1662), Moderator of the General Assembly in 1719
 James Grierson (minister, born 1791), Moderator of the General Assembly in 1854/55